508th may refer to:

508th Aerospace Sustainment Wing (508 ASW) is a wing of the United States Air Force based out of Hill Air Force Base, Utah
508th Air Refueling Squadron (508 ARS) was an aerial refueling unit that operated the Boeing KB-29 at Turner AFB, Georgia
508th Fighter Squadron, inactive United States Air Force unit
508th Fighter Wing, United States Air Force Reserve unit active with Tenth Air Force, based at Hill Air Force Base, Utah
508th Heavy Panzer Battalion, heavy tank battalion of the German Army during World War II, equipped with Tiger I heavy tanks
508th Infantry Regiment (United States) (508th PIR or Red Devils), regiment of the 82d Airborne Division, became part of XVIII Airborne Corps
508th Missile Squadron (508 MS), missile unit located at Whiteman AFB, Missouri

See also
508 (number)
508, the year 508 (DVIII) of the Julian calendar
508 BC